A list of films produced in Argentina in 1999:

See also
1999 in Argentina

External links and references
 Argentine films of 1999 at the Internet Movie Database

1999
Argentine
Films